The 2015 Patriot League baseball tournament took place on consecutive weekends, with the semifinals held May 9–10 and the finals May 16–17.  The higher seeded teams hosted each best of three series.   won their second tournament championship to earn the conference's automatic bid to the 2015 NCAA Division I baseball tournament.

Seeding
The top four finishers from the regular season are seeded one through four, with the top seed hosting the fourth seed and second seed hosting the third.  The visiting team will be designated as the home team in the second game of each series.

Results

References

Tournament
Patriot League Baseball Tournament
Pat